TeX is a free typesetting system for which many extensions have been developed.

Languages
 ArabTeX – adds support for Hebrew and Arabic alphabets
 FarsiTeX – adds support for Farsi
 Omega (TeX) – extends multilinguality by using the Basic Multilingual Plane of Unicode
 XeTeX – uses Unicode, adds additional fonts
 TIPA (software) – supports phonetic characters
 CTeX – Chinese TeX  
 MonTeX – Mongolian LaTeX

Science
 AMS-LaTeX and AMS-TeX - classes and packages developed for the American Mathematical Society; extensions of LaTeX and TeX respectively
 CircuiTikZ - adds creation of electrical networks (adds on to TikZ)
 REVTeX - collection of LaTeX macros used for scientific journals
 XyMTeX - supports chemical structure diagrams

General
 BibTeX - adds reference management software
 ConTeXt - general-purpose document processor
 LaTeX - collection of macros written by Leslie Lamport
 LuaTeX - all internals can be accessed from Lua
 pdfTeX - outputs PDF files directly

Other
 MusiXTeX - allows music typesetting
 Gregorio - allows typesetting of Gregorian chant
 PGF/TikZ - languages that provide vector graphics
 PSTricks - allows using PostScript drawings
 Texinfo - used for software manuals, can produce both print and Web documentation)

See also
 CTANComprehensive TeX Archive Network

References

TeX
TeX